Foundation Rwanda Inc is a USA-based organization, founded in 2007, to support rape survivors and their children in Rwanda. The organization is based in New York, United States of America.

History 
In February 2006, photojournalist Jonathan Torgovnik traveled to East Africa on behalf of Newsweek magazine to develop the story for the 25th anniversary of HIV/AIDS. While there, he met Margaret, a Rwandan survivor who was brutally raped during the genocide, impregnated, and contracted HIV. This horrific story led Torgovnik to embark on a photography project to document and tell the stories of 30 women like Margaret. He learned an estimated 20,000 children were born from rape during the genocide and that their mothers were unable to afford the secondary school fees to keep these children in school.  While sympathizing with the ongoing challenges these women and children face daily, Torgovnik joined with a non-profit professional, Jules Shell to create Foundation Rwanda in 2007 which would in turn help these women.

Work

The Education Initiative 
Currently, all of Rwanda’s estimated 20,000 children born of rape will be turning eighteen and be eligible for secondary school. The annual tuition rates are as follows: PreK $7500 Kindergarten: $15,356, grades 1-5: $20,790, grades 6-8: $22,208, and grades 9-12: $24,806. Families also incur initial application and registration fees of $500 for Pre-K and KG to $1,000 from G1 to 12 with a family maximum of $2,000.

Foundation Rwanda is currently sponsoring the secondary school fees for 830 children to sponsor 1500 children in 2012. It partners with local NGOs to establish outreach programs throughout the country, which identifies affected families, pays secondary school fees directly to the partner schools, and supplies the necessary books, uniforms, and transportation to enable the children to attend school. 

To date, Foundation Rwanda also connects families to a range of psychological, social, and medical services provided by existing local partners.

In 2008, London's National Portrait Gallery recognized one of Torgovnik's photographs, awarding it first prize in its prestigious annual portrait competition.

References

Organizations established in 2007